To be given the title "accredited specialist", is the highest accreditation attainable as a solicitor in Australia. To become an accredited specialist, a solicitor must meet certain requirements and go through various examination stages, testing their skills and knowledge in the specific area of the law that they are competent in. Once a solicitor fulfils the requirements, they are entitled to use the prestigious title of accredited specialist after their name to differentiate themselves as experts in that area of law.

History 
Specialist accreditation was established in 1992 with aims to:

 Provide the profession and public with a reliable means of identifying a practitioner with proven expertise in their chosen area of law;
 Contribute to and encourage continues development and improvement of standards, quality and delivery of legal services;
 Promote the advancement of legal knowledge and skills; and 
 Provide practitioners with the opportunity to demonstrate expertise in their chosen are of law and to have this recognised.

To become an accredited specialist a solicitor needs to meet the following requirements:

 Hold a current solicitor's practising certificate;
 Be a current solicitor member of the Law society or full solicitor member of an equivalent body in an Australian state or territory;
 Be engaged in the practice of law full-time for at least 5 years;
 In each of the three years immediately preceding your application, have been engaged in the area of practice of law in which you would like to become an accreditation specialist;
 In the three years preceding this application, have practiced in the area for not less than 25% of full-time practice.

Specialist Accreditation exam 
The Specialist Accreditation exam occurs every year but once every two years for a specific area of law. For example, there was a specialist accreditation exam for Immigration law in 2018, you'll be expecting the next exam in 2020.

The accreditation process takes approximately 6–7 months until results are released. The processes are as follow:

 Submitting application for specialist accreditation before closing date
 Take home assessments where solicitors are given a timeframe to complete
 Formal written exams and live assessments
 Results released

Areas of law 
Only solicitors as individuals can become an accredited specialist, not firms. Specialist accreditation are offered in 18 areas of law:

Australian immigration law (also see the Migration Act)
Advocacy
Business law
 Children's Law
 Commercial litigation
Criminal law
Dispute resolution
Employment & Industrial relations
Family law
Government & Administrative law
Local government and planning law
Mediation
Personal injury law
Planning & Environment law
Property law
Public law
Taxation law – also see Taxation in Australia
Wills & Estates law

You can tell when a lawyer is an accredited specialist when they show the logo which is as mark of excellence. When a solicitor or lawyer receives this accreditation it is usually newsworthy due to how hard it is to be obtained. Solicitors that hold this accreditation are usually then appointed to high ranking roles such as the NSW Industrial Relations Commission.

A list of those specialists can be found via the respective states law society to validate that an individual is actually accredited. For example, the accredited solicitors in NSW can be found via NSW LAW SOCIETY.

Accredited Specialist by State in Australia

New South Wales Accredited Specialist 
The table below consists of Accredited Specialist in some areas of law in New South Wales. Accredited Specialists can also be found in other areas of law and can be found on the Law Society of New South Wales website.

Queensland Accredited Specialist 
Queensland Law Society currently recognises 10 areas of specialty.

Victoria Accredited Specialist 
Law Institute of Victoria recognises 16 areas of speciality but not all areas are available at the same time in a given year.

Areas of Accredited Specialisation in Victoria in 2020 vs year 2021.

South Australia Accredited Specialist 
The Law Society of South Australia currently has 17 Accredited Specialists in two areas of law, Family Law and Immigration Law.

Western Australia Accredited Specialist 
The Law Society of Western Australia offers Specialist Accreditation programmes in Family Law, Mediation and Quality Practice Standard.

See also 

 Law Council of Australia 
 Federal Circuit Court of Australia 
 Law of Australia 
 Australian Law Reform Commission
 New South Wales Law Reform Commission
 Victorian Law Reform Commission

References

External links 

 Accredited Specialist
 Legal Services in Australia 
 Law Society – Solicitor's Practising Certificate 
 The Law Society of South Australia – Accredited Specialist 
 Law Society of Tasmania – Accreditation Specialisations 
 Law Society of Western Australia – Accreditation
 Policy on Mutual Recognition of Accredited Specialists

Legal education in Australia
Law of Australia